The feminist art movement in the United States began in the early 1970s and sought to promote the study, creation, understanding and promotion of women's art. 
First-generation feminist artists include Judy Chicago, Miriam Schapiro, Suzanne Lacy, Judith Bernstein, Sheila de Bretteville, Mary Beth Edelson, Carolee Schneeman, Rachel Rosenthal, and many other women. They were part of the Feminist art movement in the United States in the early 1970s to develop feminist writing and art.  The movement spread quickly through museum protests in both New York (May 1970) and Los Angeles (June 1971), via an early network called W.E.B. (West-East Bag) that disseminated news of feminist art activities from 1971 to 1973 in a nationally circulated newsletter, and at conferences such as the West Coast Women's Artists Conference held at California Institute of the Arts (January 21–23, 1972) and the Conference of Women in the Visual Arts, at the Corcoran School of Art in Washington, D.C. (April 20–22, 1972).

1970s

The Feminist Art Movement of the 1970s, within the second wave of feminism, "was a major watershed in women's history and the history of art" and "the personal is political" was its slogan.

Key activities

Maintenance Art—Proposal for an Exhibition
In 1969 Mierle Laderman Ukeles wrote a manifesto entitled Maintenance Art—Proposal for an Exhibition, challenging the domestic role of women and proclaiming herself a "maintenance artist". Maintenance, for Ukeles, is the realm of human activities that keep things going, such as cooking, cleaning and child-rearing and her performances in the 1970s included the cleaning of art galleries.  Her first performance called Touch Sanitation was from 1979-80.

Art Workers' Coalition demands equal representation for women
A demand for equality in representation for female artists was codified in the Art Workers' Coalition's (AWC) Statement of Demands, which was developed in 1969 and published in definitive form in March 1970. The AWC was set up to defend the rights of artists and force museums and galleries to reform their practices. While the coalition sprung up as a protest movement following Greek kinetic sculptor Panagiotis "Takis" Vassilakis's physical removal of his work Tele-Sculpture(1960) from a 1969 exhibition at the Museum of Modern Art, New York, it quickly issued a broad list of demands to 'art museums in general'.

Alongside calls for free admission, better representation of ethnic minorities, late openings and an agreement that galleries would not exhibit an artwork without the artist's consent, the AWC demanded that museums 'encourage female artists to overcome centuries of damage done to the image of the female as an artist by establishing equal representation of the sexes in exhibitions, museum purchases and on selection committees'.

Initial feminist art classes
The first women's art class was taught in the fall of 1970 at Fresno State College, now California State University, Fresno, by artist Judy Chicago. It became the Feminist Art Program, a full 15-unit program, in the Spring of 1971. This was the first feminist art program in the United States. Fifteen students studied under Chicago at Fresno State College: Dori Atlantis, Susan Boud, Gail Escola, Vanalyne Green, Suzanne Lacy, Cay Lang, Karen LeCocq, Jan Lester, Chris Rush, Judy Schaefer, Henrietta Sparkman, Faith Wilding, Shawnee Wollenman, Nancy Youdelman, and Cheryl Zurilgen. Together, as the Feminist Art Program, these women rented and refurbished an off-campus studio at 1275 Maple Avenue in downtown Fresno. Here they collaborated on art, held reading groups, and discussion groups about their life experiences which then influenced their art. 
Later, Judy Chicago and Miriam Schapiro reestablished the Feminist Art Program (FAP) at California Institute of the Arts. After Chicago left for Cal Arts, the class at Fresno State College was continued by Rita Yokoi from 1971 to 1973, and then by Joyce Aiken in 1973, until her retirement in 1992.

The Fresno Feminist Art Program served as a model for other feminist art efforts, such as Womanhouse, a collaborative feminist art exhibition and the first project produced after the Feminist Art Program moved to the California Institute of the Arts in the fall of 1971. Womanhouse existed in 1972, was organized by Judy Chicago and Miriam Schapiro, and was the first public exhibition of feminist art. Womanhouse, like the Fresno project, also developed into a feminist studio space and promoted the concept of collaborative women's art.

The Feminist Studio Workshop was founded in Los Angeles in 1973 by Judy Chicago, Arlene Raven, and Sheila Levrant de Bretteville as a two-year feminist art program. Women from the program were instrumental in finding and creating the Woman's Building, the first independent center to showcase women's art and culture. Galleries existed there for the entire history of the organization and that was a major venue for exhibiting feminist art.

Art historian Arlene Raven established the Feminist Art Program in Los Angeles.

Why Have There Been No Great Women Artists?

In 1971, the art historian Linda Nochlin published the article "Why Have There Been No Great Women Artists?" in Woman in Sexist Society, which was later reprinted in ArtNews, where she claimed that there were no "great" women artists at that time, nor in history. By omission, this inferred that artists like Georgia O'Keeffe and Mary Cassatt were not considered great. She stated why she felt that there were no great women artists and what organizational and institutional changes needed to take place to create better opportunities for women.

The author Lucy Lippard and others identified three tasks to further the understanding and promotion of works by women:
 Find and present current and historic art works by women
 Develop a more informal language for writing about art by women
 Create theories about the meanings behind women's art and create a history of their works.

Some Living American Women Artists / Last Supper 
Mary Beth Edelson's Some Living American Women Artists / Last Supper (1972) appropriated Leonardo da Vinci’s The Last Supper, with the heads of notable women artists collaged over the heads of Christ and his apostles. The artists collaged over the heads of Christ and his apostles in Some Living American Women Artists / Last Supper include Lynda Benglis, Louise Bourgeois, Elaine de Kooning, Helen Frankenthaler, Nancy Graves, Lila Katzen, Lee Krasner,  Georgia O'Keeffe, Louise Nevelson, Yoko Ono, M. C. Richards, Alma Thomas, and June Wayne. As well, other women artists have their image shown in the border of the piece; in all eighty-two women artists are part of the whole image. This image, addressing the role of religious and art historical iconography in the subordination of women, became "one of the most iconic images of the feminist art movement."

Approaches
In California, the approach to improve the opportunities for women artists focused on creating venues, such as the Woman's Building and the Feminist Studio Workshop (FSW), located with the Woman's Building. Gallery spaces, feminist magazine offices, a bookstore, and a cafe were some of the key uses of the Feminist Studio Workshop.

Organizations like A.I.R. Gallery and Women Artists in Revolution (WAR) were formed in New York to provide greater opportunity for female artists and protest for to include works of women artist in art venues that had very few women represented, like Whitney Museum and the Museum of Modern Art. In 1970 there was a 23% increase in the number of women artists, and the previous year there was a 10% increase, due to Whitney Annual (later Whitney Biennial) protests.

The New York Feminist Art Institute opened in June 1979 at 325 Spring Street in the Port Authority Building. The founding members and the initial board of directors were Nancy Azara, Miriam Schapiro, Selena Whitefeather, Lucille Lessane, Irene Peslikis and Carol Stronghilos. A board of advisers was established of accomplished artists, educators and professional women. For instance, feminist writer and arts editor at Ms. Magazine Harriet Lyons was an adviser from its start.

Three Weeks in May
In 1977, Suzanne Lacy and collaborator Leslie Labowitz combined performance art with activism in Three Weeks in May on the steps of Los Angeles City Hall. The performance, which included a map of rapes in the city, and self-defense classes, highlighted sexual violence against women.

"Art Hysterical Notions of Progress and Culture" 
Valerie Jaudon and Joyce Kozloff co-authored the widely anthologized "Art Hysterical Notions of Progress and Culture" (1978), in which they explained how they thought sexist and racist assumptions underlaid Western art history discourse. They reasserted the value of ornamentation and aesthetic beauty - qualities assigned to the feminine sphere.

Organizations and efforts

Publications
The Feminist Art Journal was a feminist art publication that was produced from 1972 to 1977, and was the first stable, widely read journal of its kind. Beginning in 1975 there were scholarly publications about feminism, feminist art and historic women's art, most notably Through the Flower: My Struggle as a Woman Artist by Judy Chicago; and Against Our Will: Men, Women and Rape (1975) by Susan Brownmiller; Woman Artists: 1550-1950 (1976) about Linda Nochlin and Ann Sutherland Harris's exhibition; From the Center: Feminist Essays in Women's Art (1976) by Lucy Lippard; Of Woman Born, by Adrienne Rich, When God Was a Woman (1976) by Merlin Stone; By Our Own Hands (1978) by Faith Wilding; Gyn/Ecology (1978) by Mary Daly; and Woman and Nature by Susan Griffin.
	
In 1977, both Chrysalis and Heresies: A Feminist Publication on Art and Politics began publication.

1980s
Feminist art evolved during the 1980s, with a trend away from experiential works and social causes. Instead, there was a trend toward works based upon Postmodern theory and influenced by psychoanalysis. Inequal representation in the art world was a continuing issue.  According to Judy Chicago in a 1981 interview,

Key activities

Guerrilla Girls
Guerrilla Girls was formed by 7 women artists in the spring of 1985 in response to the Museum of Modern Art's exhibition "An International Survey of Recent Painting and Sculpture", which opened in 1984. The exhibition was the inaugural show in the MoMA's newly renovated and expanded building, and was planned to be a survey of the most important contemporary artists.

The Guerrilla Girls have researched sexism and created artworks at the request of various people and institutions, among others, the Istanbul Modern, Istanbul, Witte de With Center for Contemporary Arts, Rotterdam and Fundación Bilbao Arte Fundazioa, Bilbao. They have also partnered with Amnesty International, contributing pieces to a show under the organization's "Protect the Human" initiative.

Mass communication
Mass communication is "the process by which a person, group of people, or large organization creates a message and transmits it through some type of medium to a large, anonymous, heterogeneous audience." Women such as Barbara Kruger and Jenny Holzer used forms of graphic mass communication such as refined slogans and graphics to increase awareness of the inequity faced by women artists.

Kiki Smith

During the 1970s Kiki Smith was one of the many artists involved in the collaborative projects. As the art scene became more politicized in the 1980s, Kiki Smith's art work also became more political as well. Her work started "involving issues like abortion, race and AIDS." When asked if she considered herself a feminist artist, Smith responded:

Yes, I would say that generationally I am, and I would say that without the feminist movement I wouldn't exist; and an enormous amount of the artwork that we take for granted wouldn't exist; and a lot of the subject matter that we assume can be encompassed by art wouldn't exist.  The feminist movement exponentially expanded what art is, and how we look at art, and who is considered to be included in the discourse of art-making. I think that it caused a tremendous, radical change. You don't want to have a cultural notion that one specific gender embodies creativity. All humanity – and all aspects of gender and sexuality and how people define themselves – are inherently creative. It's against the interests of the culture at large not to embrace feminism as a model, just like many other models of liberation, because they don't only liberate women, they liberate everybody.

Sister Serpents 
Sister Serpents was a radical feminist art collective that began as a small group women in Chicago in the summer of 1989, as a direct response to the Webster v. Reproductive Health Services Supreme Court decision. Their goal as a collective was to empower women and to increase awareness of women's issues through radical art, and to use art as a weapon to battle misogyny.

Publications
Feminist Art Journal
 Genders: Feminist Art and (Post)Modern Anxieties
 M/E/A/N/I/N/G had 20 issues (1986-1996) and 5 on-line issues (2002-2011)
 Woman's Art Journal (1980–present)
Heresies
LTTR
Meridians
The Journal of Women and Performance

1990s

Key activities

Bad Girls
Bad Girls (Part I) and Bad Girls (Part II) were a 1994 pair of exhibitions at New Museum in New York, curated by Marcia Tucker. A companion exhibition, Bad Girls West was curated by Marcia Tanner and exhibited at UCLA's Wright Gallery the same year.

Sexual Politics: Judy Chicago's The Dinner Party in Feminist Art History

Sexual Politics: Judy Chicago's The Dinner Party in Feminist Art History, a 1996 exhibition and text curated and written by Amelia Jones, re-exhibited Judy Chicago's The Dinner Party for the first time since 1988.  It was presented by the UCLA Armand Hammer Museum.

Riot Grrrl

The Riot grrrl movement was focused mostly on music, but the DIY aspect of this scene included feminist knowledge in forms of underground zines, which included poems, articles, comics, etc.

Publications
n.paradoxa (1998–present)

2000s

Key activities

WACK! Art and the Feminist Revolution
The 2007 exhibition, WACK! Art and the Feminist Revolution, focused on the feminist art movement. It was organized by the Museum of Contemporary Art, Los Angeles and traveled to PS1 Contemporary Art Center in New York.  WACK! featured by 120 artists from 21 countries, covering the period of 1965-1980.

A Studio of Their Own
A Studio of Their Own: The Legacy of the Fresno Feminist Experiment was performed on the California State University, Fresno campus at the Phebe Conley Art Gallery in 2009. It was a retrospective that paid homage to the women from the 1970s who were part of the first women's art program.

The Feminist Art Project
The Feminist Art Project website and information portal was founded at Rutgers University in 2006. A resource for artists and scholars in the United States, it publishes a calendar of events and runs conferences, discussions and education projects.  It describes itself as "a strategic intervention against the ongoing erasure of women from the cultural record".

Feminist art curatorial practices

History

Feminist art curating practices are within a museumism genre, which is a deconstructing of the museum space by curator/artist where the museum looks at itself or the artist/curator looks at the museum.

"If artists as curators of their own exhibition is no longer uncommon, neither is the artist-created museum or collection ... These artists use museological practices to confront the ways in which museums rewrite history through the politics of collecting and presentation ... However, their work often inadvertently reasserts the validity of the museum" (Corrin, 1994, p. 5).

Katy Deepwell documents feminist curating practice and feminist art history with a theoretical foundation that feminist curating is not biologically determinate.

Characteristics

Feminist art curatorial practices are collaborative and reject the notion of an artist as an individual creative genius.

Examples

 The Out of Here exhibition is an example of feminist art curatorial practice.
 Womanhouse
 Teatro Chicana: A Collective Memoir and Selected Plays highlights El Movimiento and Chicana women's civil rights movements representing their varied communities and histories.

2010s

Key activities
!Women Art Revolution

The documentary film !Women Art Revolution was played at New York's IFC Center beginning June 1, 2011, before opening around the country.

Woman's Building

The Los Angeles Woman's Building was the subject of a major exhibition in 2012 at the Ben Maltz Gallery at Otis College of Art and Design called Doin' It in Public, Feminism and Art at the Woman's Building. It included oral histories on video, emphemera, and artists' projects. It was part of the Getty initiative Pacific Standard Time.

Stop Telling Women To Smile

Stop Telling Women To Smile was an ongoing, traveling series that started in Fall of 2012. Artist Tatyana Fazlalizadeh, started this project in Brooklyn, NYC, but had also been in Chicago, Paris, and Mexico City. Street art such as STWTS is a modern way of mass communication art.

"Gallery Tally"

In 2013, Michol Hebron started the "Gallery Tally" project, where Hebron had different galleries across Los Angeles and New York make posters showing the uneven representation in the art world. She found that about 70% of artists represented in these two cities are men. Hebron has extended this project outside of L.A., and now continues the project all over the states, with updates to her blog.In 2015, Hebron went through every cover published from Artforum. Since 1962, there have been 526 different monthly covers. Hebron found only 18% feature art by women, and male artists made 74% of the covers.

"Guarded"

"Guarded" was a photography project by artist Taylor Yocom in 2015 for which Yocom photographed students from University of Iowa, showing what these women carried with them when they had to walk alone at night.

Now Be Here

Now Be Here was a project from August 28, 2016, where 733 female and female identifying women came together in Los Angeles to be photographed together to show solidarity. The project continued with Now Be Here #2 at the Brooklyn Museum on October 23, 2016, and Now Be Here #3 at the Pérez Art Museum Miami (PAMM) on December 10, 2016.

The Future is Female

The Future is Female art exhibit located within the 21C Museum and Hotel in Louisville, Kentucky opened its doors just following our most recent presidential election and features feminist art works that operate to epitomize the experience of womanhood while simultaneously addressing larger global issues. The exhibit highlights the artwork of handful of feminist artists including Vibha Galhotra, Alison Saar, Carrie Mae Weems, Michele Pred, Frances Goodman, Kiki Smith, and Sanell Aggenbach who emerged in the wake of the second wave Feminist Arts Movement.

Women's Invitational Exhibition 2017

The Women's Invitational Exhibition is an art exhibit that features the works from minority women artists. The entire gallery showcases only a select few artists. However, each individual woman shows multitude of different topics via a variety of mediums.

Hands On

HANDS ON is collection of works by Karen Lederer made in 2017. Works within the collection date from 2015 to 2017. The art was made in response to political debates about women.

Faith Wilding: Fearful Symmetries

In 2018, Carnegie Mellon University hosted a retrospective of Faith Wilding's artwork, which became a traveling exhibit.

See also
 Feminist art criticism
 Feminist art movement
 Feminist pornography
 Feminist Porn Award
 Feminism in the United States
 Gender equality
 Go Topless Day
 Pattern and Decoration art movement, related to feminist art movement
 Sex-positive feminism
 Where We At Black Women Artists (WWA)

Notes

References

Further reading
 Armstrong, Carol and Catherine de Zegher (eds.), Women Artists at the Millennium, The MIT Press, Cambridge, 2006.
 Bee, Susan and Mira Schor (eds.), The M/E/A/N/I/N/G Book, Duke University Press, Durham, NC, 2000.
 Bloom, Lisa Jewish Identities in American Feminist Art: Ghosts of Ethnicity London & New York: Routledge, 2006.
 Brown, Betty Ann, ed. Expanding Circles: Women, Art & Community. New York: Midmarch, 1996.
 Broude, Norma and Mary Garrard The Power of Feminist Art: Emergence, Impact and Triumph of the American Feminist Art Movement  New York, Abrams, 1994.
 Butler, Connie. WACK! Art and the Feminist Revolution, Los Angeles: Museum of Contemporary Art. 2007.
 Chicago, Judy. Beyond the Flower: The Autobiography of a Feminist Artist. New York: Viking, 1996.
 Chicago, Judy. The Dinner Party: A Symbol of Our Heritage. Garden City, N.Y.: Anchor Press/Doubleday, 1979.
 Chicago, Judy. Embroidering Our Heritage: The Dinner Party. Garden City, N.Y.: Anchor Press/Doubleday, 1979.
 Cottingham, Laura. How Many 'Bad' Feminists Does It Take to Change a Light Bulb? New York: Sixty Percent Solution. 1994.
 Cottingham, Laura. Seeing Through the Seventies: Essays on Feminism and Art. Amsterdam, The Netherlands: G+B Arts, 2000.
 Farris, Phoebe (ed) Women Artists of Colour: A bio-critical Sourcebook to 20th Century Artists in the Americas Westport, Connecticut: Greenwood Press, 1990. 
 Frostig, Karen and Kathy A. Halainka eds. Blaze: Discourse on Art, Women and Feminism USA, Cambridge Scholar, 2007.
 Hammond, Harmony Lesbian Art in America: A Contemporary History New York: Rizzoli International Publications Inc, 2000.
 Frueh, Joanna, Cassandra L. Langer, and Arlene Raven, eds. New Feminist Criticism: Art, Identity, Action, 1993.
 Hess, Thomas B. and Elizabeth C. Baker, eds. Art and Sexual Politics: Women's Liberation, Women Artists, and Art History. New York, Macmillan, 1973
 Isaak, Jo Anna . Feminism and Contemporary Art: The Revolutionary Power of Women's Laughter. New York: Routledge, 1996.
 King-Hammond, Leslie (ed) Gumbo Ya Ya: Anthology of Contemporary African-American Women Artists New York: Midmarch Press, 1995. 
 Lippard, Lucy The Pink Glass Swan: Selected Feminist Essays on Art New York: New Press, 1996. 
 Meyer, Laura, ed. A Studio of Their Own: The Legacy of the Fresno Feminist Experiment. Fresno, Calif.: Press at California State University, Fresno, 2009.
 Perez, Laura Elisa  Chicana art : the politics of spiritual and aesthetic altarities  Durham, N.C. : Duke University Press; Chesham: 2007.
 Phelan, Peggy. Art and Feminism. London: Phaidon, 2001.
 Raven, Arlene. Crossing Over: Feminism and Art of Social Concern. 1988
 Siegel, Judy Mutiny and the Mainstream: Talk that Changed Art,1975-1990 New York: Midmarch Arts Press, 1992. 
 Schor, Mira. Wet: On Painting, Feminism, and Art Culture. Durham, NC: Duke University Press. 1997
 Wilding. Faith. By Our Own Hands: The Women Artist's Movement, Southern California, 1970-1976.

External links
 American Feminist Art Timeline 

1970s establishments in the United States
Art movements
American art movements
American contemporary art
Feminist theory
Feminist artists
Feminist theatre
Political art